Shahid Hameed (Punjabi), known simply as Shahid, is a Pakistani film actor who starred in many films of the 1970s and 1980s. 

His first film was Aansoo, released in 1971. He worked in more than 150 films. Shahid quit working in films as a result of sub-standard film production in Pakistan film industry after he worked ZOR which was released in 1998. He made his comeback with film Wujood (2018) after a hiatus of 20 years.

Personal life 
Shahid's first wife, to whom he has been married for some 50 years, and to whom he remains married, is Begum Munaza Shahid. They were both very young when they were married, and the match was arranged by their families in the usual South Asian manner. They are blessed with three sons, Kamran, Imran and Zaheer. Their son Kamran Shahid is a noted TV anchor and hosts a show on the Duniya News (Pakistan) TV channel called On The Front with Kamran Shahid.

In the early 1980s, while married to his first wife, Shahid also married and divorced three popular Pakistani actresses, Zumurrud, Ishrat Chaudhry and Babra Sharif. Begum Munaza Shahid accepted these marriages as par for the course, receiving and bidding goodbye to each of her co-wives with some grace.

Filmography 
 Yeh Aman (1971)
 Tehzeeb (1971)
 Umrao Jan Ada (1972)
 Thah (1972)- Punjabi language film
 Baharon Ki Manzil (1973)
 Anmol (1973)
 Deedar (1974)
 Naukar Wohti Da (1974)
 Bin Badal Barsaat (1975)
 Tere Mere Sapne (1975)
 Aik Gunnah Aur Sahi (1975)
 Zeenat (1975)
 Shabana (1976)
 Suraiya Bhopali (1976)
 Begum Jaan (1977)
 Shama-e-Mohabbat (1977) (credited as Shahid Hameed)
 Mr. Ranjha (1979)
 Aap Ki Khatir (1980)
 Mirza Jat (1982)
 Do Hathkadian (1985)
 Chan Punjab Da (1988)
 Wujood (2018)

Awards and recognition
 Nigar Award for Best Actor in film Shabana (1976)
 Nigar Award for Best Supporting Actor in film Deedar (1974)

See also 
 List of Lollywood actors

References

External links 
 
 Filmography of actor Shahid on Pakistan Film Magazine website

1950 births
Living people
Pakistani male film actors
Punjabi people
Nigar Award winners
People from Lahore